The Panama Canal Authority is the agency of the government of Panama responsible for the operation and management of the Panama Canal. The ACP took over the administration of the canal from the Panama Canal Commission, the joint US–Panama agency that managed the canal, on December 31, 1999, when the canal was handed over from the United States to Panama as per the Torrijos–Carter Treaties. It is headquartered in Balboa, a district of Panama City.

Establishment
The Panama Canal Authority is established under Title XIV of the National Constitution, and has exclusive responsibility for the operation, administration, management, preservation, maintenance, and modernization of the canal. It is responsible for the operation of the canal in a safe, continuous, efficient, and profitable manner.

The Organic Law of the Panama Canal Authority, passed on June 11, 1997, provides the legal framework for the canal's organization and operation.

Organization

Because of its unique nature, the ACP has financial autonomy, as well as ownership of the canal's assets.

The Board of Directors is responsible for establishing policies for the operation, improvement, and modernization of the Canal, as well as supervising its management pursuant to the National Constitution, the Panama Canal Authority Organic Law, and the Regulations thereto appertaining.

The board of directors is made up as follows:
 One Director designated by the President of the Republic, who shall chair the Board of Directors and shall have the rank of Minister of State for Canal Affairs. 
 One Director designated by the Legislative Branch, who may be freely appointed or removed thereby. 
 Nine Directors appointed by the President of the Republic with the consent of the Cabinet Council and ratification by an absolute majority of the members of the Legislative Assembly.

The Directors shall serve in their posts for a term of 9 years, and may only be removed for the reasons set forth in Article 20 of the Panama Canal Authority Organic Law.

The Panama Canal is defined by law to be an inalienable patrimony of the Republic of Panama. Therefore, it may  not be sold, assigned, mortgaged, or otherwise encumbered or transferred.

Board of directors
The Panama Canal Authority Board of Directors is responsible for establishing policies for the operation, improvement, and modernization of the Canal, as well as supervising its management.

At present, the Panama Canal Authority Board of Directors is made up of the following members:

References

External links
 Official website

Panama Canal
Government of Panama
Organizations based in Panama